Kardzhali Municipality is a municipality in Kardzhali Province, Bulgaria. Its administrative centre is Kardzhali.

Demography

Ethnic groups
According to the 2011 census, the municipality of Kardzhali was mostly inhabited by ethnic Turks (55.5%) and ethnic Bulgarians (40.5%), with Romani people, others and undeclared comprising the rest of the population.

Vital statistics
The municipality of Kardzhali has a slightly higher birth rate than the Bulgarian average, while its death rate is significantly lower. The municipality has favourable demographic indicators compared to the rest of Kardzhali Province and Bulgaria as whole.

Religion
According to the latest Bulgarian census of 2011, the religious composition, among those who answered the optional question on religious identification, was the following: 

A majority of the population of Kardzhali Municipality identify themselves as Muslims. At the 2011 census, 52.8% of respondents identified as believers of Islam, mostly ethnic Turks and a small Pomak population. The Bulgarian minority is mostly Orthodox Christian belonging to the Bulgarian Orthodox Church (37.1%).

References 

Municipalities in Kardzhali Province